Mikhaël Hers (born 6 February 1975) is a French film director and screenwriter. 

His directorial credits includes Memory Lane (2010), This Summer Feeling (2015) and Amanda (2018) among others. His latest film The Passengers of the Night (2022) premiered at the 72nd Berlin International Film Festival, where it competed for the Golden Bear.

Career
After studying at La Fémis in the production section, from which he graduated in 2004. In 2006 he made his first medium-length film, Charell, adapted from a novel by Patrick Modiano. The film was notably selected for Critics' Week at the Cannes Film Festival.

In 2007, he directed Primrose Hill, also selected for Critics' Week and awarded at Clermont-Ferrand. In 2009, his third medium-length film, Montparnasse won the Jean-Vigo prize and was awarded at the Directors' Fortnight in Cannes that same year.

In 2010, he directed his first feature, Memory Lane, shown for the first time at the Locarno International Film Festival . The film is released in France in November 2010. In 2015, he shot his second feature film, This Summer Feeling.

In 2018, his film Amanda won the Grand Prize and Best Screenplay award at the Tokyo International Film Festival.

Filmography

References

External links 
 

1975 births
Living people
21st-century French male writers
21st-century French screenwriters
Film directors from Paris
French male screenwriters
French screenwriters
Writers from Paris